Capital punishment in the Bahamas is a legal punishment, and is conducted by hanging at Fox Hill Prison. The last execution in the country was on January 6, 2000. As of August 2012, only one convict, Mario Flowers, was under the sentence of death. Flowers' death sentence was commuted in 2016. Since independence from Britain, it has held more than a dozen executions.

List of executions
This list is currently complete from 1976.

References

Bahamas
Crime in the Bahamas
Law of the Bahamas
Human rights abuses in the Bahamas
Human rights in the Bahamas